The onefin skate (Gurgesiella dorsalifera) is a species of fish in the family Gurgesiellidae. It is endemic to Brazil.  Its natural habitat is open seas.

Sources 

onefin skate
Endemic fauna of Brazil
Fish of Brazil
onefin skate
Taxonomy articles created by Polbot